Power 3000 was a Sinclair ZX81 clone from Creon Enterprises. Identical with Lambda 8300 and PC 8300.

References

Sinclair ZX81 clones